Saylorsburg is a census-designated place and unincorporated community in Monroe County, Pennsylvania, United States. As of the 2010 census, its population was 1,126. The village is located in both Ross Township and Hamilton Township.

Saylorsburg is in the Pocono Mountains.

One of the two main centers of Arsha Vidya Gurukulam is located here. This is a Hindu Vedic teaching center founded by Swami Dayananda Saraswati.

Notable person
Fethullah Gülen - founder of the Gülen movement,  resides here.

References

Census-designated places in Monroe County, Pennsylvania
Census-designated places in Pennsylvania
Unincorporated communities in Monroe County, Pennsylvania
Unincorporated communities in Pennsylvania